Boyne Valley Greyhound Stadium was a greyhound racing stadium on Limekiln Hill, East of the Trim Road in Navan, County Meath.

Opening 
The opening night at the Boyne Valley Greyhound Stadium was on 21 June 1950. The track was opened by Senator P. Fitzsimons, Chairman of Meath Co. by the director Johnny Cantwell. There were seven races won by Flashlight Freddie, Just a Dog, Trial Times, Baytown Apple, Sky Goal, Few Words and Silver Abbey.

History
The track had a large 500 yard circuit circumference and Johnny Cantwell was the first Racing Manager for the Boyne Valley Greyhound Racing Company but following his death the company passed to his sons John and William. 

In 1960 the track first ran the Cesarewitch which gained classic status. Winners of the competition included Yanka Boy and Postal Vote before Ritas Choice broke the track record in the final in 1973. The event continued to produce significant winners including Itsachampion, Ballybeg Prim and Rahan Ship.

In 1962 a totalisator was installed and five years later a new viewing area and bar was constructed.

The track was suspended in 1983 by the Bord na gCon after a failure to pay all prize money owed, but despite this setback the track soon returned to action and the Cesarewitch remained one of Ireland’s major events. Roan Hurricane achieved a double in 1995 and then Bonus Prince completed a treble in 1998.

Paddy Barry was the Manager of the Navan Track from 1984-1996.

Closure
Developers bought the track in 1998 for the relatively small figure of £1 million and although the track closed in 1999 it took until 2009 for the site to be developed into a new Lidl supermarket.

Competitions
Cesarewitch

Track records

References

1950 establishments in Ireland
1999 disestablishments in Ireland
Defunct greyhound racing venues in Ireland
Sport in County Meath